Alessandro Donati (born 8 May 1979 in Atri, Abruzzo) is an Italian professional road bicycle racer, currently riding for UCI Professional Continental team .

External links

1979 births
Living people
Italian male cyclists
Sportspeople from the Province of Teramo
Cyclists from Abruzzo